Barbara Hamby (born 1952) is an American poet, fiction writer, editor, and critic.

Life
She was born in New Orleans and raised in Hawaii. Her poems have been printed in numerous publications and her first book of poetry, Delirium (1995), received literary recognition. She lives with her husband and fellow poet David Kirby in Tallahassee, Florida, where she is a writer-in-residence in the Creative Writing Program, and he a professor, both with the English Department at Florida State University.

Published works
Holoholo (Pittsburgh: University of Pittsburgh Press, 2021, ISBN 9780822966586)
Bird Odyssey (Pittsburgh: University of Pittsburgh Press, 2018)
On the Street of Divine Love: New and Selected Poems (Pittsburgh: University of Pittsburgh Press, 2014)
Lester Higata's 20th Century: stories (Iowa City: University of Iowa Press, 2010)
Seriously Funny: poetry anthologyedited with David Kirby (Athens: University of Georgia Press, 2010)
All-Night Lingo Tango: poems (Pittsburgh: University of Pittsburgh Press, 2009) 
Babel: poems (Pittsburgh: University of Pittsburgh Press, 2004)
The Alphabet of Desire (New York: New York University Press, 1999, paperback )
Delirium: poems (Denton, Texas: University of North Texas Press, 1995, paperback )

Awards and honors
2010 Guggenheim Fellowship
2010 Iowa Short Fiction Award
Donald Hall Prize in Poetry (Association of Writers and Writing Programs, 2003) for Babel
New York University Poetry Prize (1998) for The Alphabet of Desire 
Kate Tufts Discovery Award (1996) for Delirium
Norma Farber First Book Award (Poetry Society of America) for Delirium
Vassar Miller Prize for Delirium

References

"Poet of Pop", Research in Review, Florida State University, Winter 2004. (Retrieved September 6, 2006)

Reviews
On the Street of Divine Love: New and Selected Poems, New York Journal of Books

External links
Mambo Cinema
 

1952 births
Living people
20th-century American poets
20th-century American women writers
21st-century American women
American women academics
American women poets
Florida State University faculty
The New Yorker people